Rywociny  is a village in the administrative district of Gmina Działdowo, within Działdowo County, Warmian-Masurian Voivodeship, in northern Poland.

Location 

The village has a population of 104.

References

Rywociny